Asplenium arcanum is a fern known from  western Mexico and Nicaragua.

Description

Roots and stipes
Asplenium arcanum has fibrous roots and an upright rhizome (underground stem). The stipes are dark purple in color at the base, becoming green towards the blade, lack wings, and have no hairs or scales except at the very base.

Leaves
Each leaf bears from one to five pairs of pinnae (the first subdivisions of the leaf). The pair closest to the base is the largest. 

Sori and spores
Fertile fronds bear from one to three pairs of sori per pinnule on both sides of the costule (pinnule midvein). The spores are kidney-shaped.

Similar species
Specimens have in the past been identified as, or thought similar to, A. fragrans, A. minimum, A. pumilum, and A. tenerrimum. It differs from A. fragrans by the dark purple (rather than green) color at the base of its stipe, from A. pumilum by the lack of long whitish hairs both above and below the leaf, from A. tenerrimum by the enlargement of the side of the lowest pinna towards the leaf base, and from A. minimum by the deeply cut and toothed pinnae and pinnules (rather than rounded and lobed).

Taxonomy
Material of this species was described by George E. Davenport in 1894 as a deeply cut variety of A. pumilum, var. laciniatum, based on material collected in Jalisco by Pringle. It was described as a species by Alan R. Smith in 2004 based on material from Nayarit. He gave it the epithet arcanum in reference to the unclear and mysterious relationship between this species and other spleenworts; it is roughly intermediate in form between A. tenerrimum and A. pumilum, but has well-formed spores, so it is not a first-generation hybrid.

Distribution and habitat
It has also been collected at Apoyo Lagoon Natural Reserve in Nicaragua.

Notes and references

References

Works cited

External links
Holotype from JSTOR Global Plants.

arcanum
Ferns of Mexico
Flora of Nicaragua